Dieter Dierks Jerks is a live album by Desmadrados Soldados de Ventura, released on 28 April 2014 by Golden Lab Records.

Track listing

Personnel
Adapted from the Dieter Dierks Jerks liner notes.

Desmadrados Soldados de Ventura
 Kate Armitage – vocals, steel drum
 Andrew Cheetham – drums
 Zak Hane – bass guitar
 Dylan Hughes – electric guitar
 Anthony Joinson – bass guitar
 Nick Mitchell – electric guitar
 Tom Settle – electric guitar
 Edwin Stevens – electric guitar

Production and additional personnel
 Alex Humphreys – cover art, illustrations
 Phil Todd – recording

Release history

References

External links 
 Dieter Dierks Jerks at Bandcamp

2014 live albums
Desmadrados Soldados de Ventura albums